Volleyball at the 2021 Summer Deaflympics  was held in Caxias Do Sul, Brazil from 3 to 13 May 2022.

Medal summary

Medalists

Indoor volleyball

Beach volleyball

Men's indoor competition

Group stage

Group A

Group B

Knockout stage

Elimination
<onlyinclude>

Classification

Women's indoor competition

Group stage

Group A

|}

Group B

|}

Knockout stage

Elimination
<onlyinclude>

|}

Classification

Beach Volleyball

Men

Women

References

External links
 Deaflympics 2021

2021 Summer Deaflympics
2022 in volleyball
International volleyball competitions hosted by Brazil